Cyclophora dimerites is a moth in the  family Geometridae. It is found in New Guinea and on Borneo.

Subspecies
Cyclophora dimerites dimerites (Borneo)
Cyclophora dimerites goliathi (Prout, 1938) (New Guinea)

References

Moths described in 1932
Cyclophora (moth)
Moths of New Guinea
Moths of Borneo